Román pro ženy is a Czech comedy film based on the 2001 novel of the same name by Michal Viewegh. It was released in 2005. The Czech title means "A Novel for Women" but the film is known in English as From Subway With Love.

Cast
Zuzana Kanócz as Laura
Marek Vašut as Oliver
Simona Stašová as Jana
Stella Zázvorková as Granny
Miroslav Donutil as Zemla
Laďka Něrgešová as Ingrid
Jaromír Nosek as Rickie
Klára Sedláčková as Sandra
Jaromír Dulava as Laura's father
Peter Smith as Jeff
David Švehlík as Hubert
Saša Rašilov as Parachutist
Juraj Ďurdiak as German Hans
Viera Kučerová as 1st Hair-dresser
Alena Vitáčková as 2nd Hair-dresser

External links
 

2005 films
Czech comedy films
2005 comedy films
2000s Czech films
2000s Czech-language films